Smol is a surname. Notable people with the surname include:

Frits Smol (1924–2006), Dutch water polo player
John Smol (born 1955), Canadian ecologist, limnologist, and paleolimnologist

See also
 Small (surname)